Sulphur Springs, Arkansas may refer to one of seven places in Arkansas:

 Sulphur Springs, Ashley County, Arkansas, an unincorporated community in Ashley County
 Sulphur Springs, Benton County, Arkansas, a city in Benton County
 Sulphur Springs, Jefferson County, Arkansas, a census-designated place in Jefferson County
 Sulphur Springs, Johnson County, Arkansas, an unincorporated community in Johnson County, formerly Union City
 Sulphur Springs, Montgomery County, Arkansas, an unincorporated community in Montgomery County, formerly Redbird
 Sulphur Springs, Van Buren County, Arkansas, an unincorporated community in Van Buren County, formerly Morganton
 Sulphur Springs, Yell County, Arkansas, an unincorporated community in Yell County